Ghoramara is a locality in southern part of Guwahati, Assam, India, surrounded by Lalmati, Lokhra and Bhetapara localities. It is near National Highway 37.

See also
 Pan Bazaar
 Paltan Bazaar
 Beltola

References

Neighbourhoods in Guwahati